Richard Keith Call (October 24, 1792 – September 14, 1862) was an American attorney, politician, and slave owner who served as the 3rd and 5th territorial governor of Florida. Before that, he was elected to the Florida Territorial Council and as a delegate to the U.S. Congress from Florida. In the mid-1830s, he developed two plantations in Leon County, Florida, one of which was several thousand acres in size. In 1860 he held more than 120 slaves and was the third-largest slaveholder in the county.

Early life and education
Richard Call was born to William and Helen Meade Walker Call and was the nephew of another Richard Call, a Revolutionary War hero.  Call was born in Pittsfield, Prince George County, Virginia. When Call was young, his father William and two of his brothers died. Shortly after 1800, his widowed mother brought her four surviving children and five slaves across the Appalachian Mountains into Kentucky. She eventually settled on land owned by her brother Senator David Walker in Russellville, Kentucky, where Call spent most of his remaining childhood. Following the death of his mother in 1810, Call settled near another uncle in Tennessee in order to receive a formal education. In 1813 he left college to take part in the Creek War, which occurred during the period of the War of 1812 with Great Britain. Call was the uncle of Wilkinson Call, who much later became a U.S. Senator.

War and politics
Richard Call came favorably to the attention of General Andrew Jackson, a leader during the war. In 1814, Call was commissioned as a first lieutenant and went to Florida to serve as Jackson's personal aide. He returned with General Jackson in 1821 to establish the territorial government after the United States acquired Florida from Spain by the Adams-Onís Treaty. After resigning from the Army in 1822, Call decided to make Florida his home and opened a legal practice.

Call was a delegate to the 1856 Know Nothing convention in Philadelphia, but walked out over the North vs. South split over slavery (demanding that Section 12 in support of the Kansas-Nebraska act be restored).

Marriage and family
In 1824 Call married Mary Letitia Kirkman of Nashville. Her parents were enemies of Jackson and opposed the marriage. The young couple was married at General Jackson's home, the Hermitage. Of their several children born, two daughters: Ellen Call Long and Mary Call Brevard, survived to adulthood.

Florida
Call made the rest of his life in Florida. He was appointed as receiver in the land office, giving him insight into developing areas. He was elected to the Legislative Council of the territory and served as a Delegate to the U.S. Congress. In the 1830s, he bought and developed two plantations in Leon County. One had nearly 9,000 acres and the other, The Grove Plantation, was a square mile in northern Tallahassee.

On March 16, 1836, he was appointed by President Andrew Jackson as the governor of the territory. During his first term, as brigadier general of the territorial militia, he led forces in fighting the Seminole Indians, winning victories at the second and third Battles of Wahoo Swamp in the Seminole War. President Martin Van Buren replaced him as governor with Robert R. Reid on December 2, 1839, following a dispute with Federal authorities over their assistance during the war.

In the 1840 presidential campaign, Call crossed party lines to assist Whig William Henry Harrison, who won and appointed him again as governor of Florida. During this second term,  which began on March 19, 1841, Call moved the territory closer to statehood. He worked to minimize the financial problems that Florida suffered due to bank failures and a national business depression. He left office on August 11, 1844.

In 1845, Florida became a state and Call sought election as governor. His role in supporting the election of President Harrison caused him to lose.

Planter and slaveholder
During the 1830s, he had developed two plantations on land that he purchased in Leon County. Orchard Pond Plantation had more than 8,000 acres and was located north of Tallahassee. The Grove Plantation was located on Tallahassee's northern outskirts, where the Governor's Mansion was later constructed. By 1860, Call had more than 100 slaves at Orchard Pond Plantation and was the third-largest slaveholder in the county. He died at The Grove on September 14, 1862.

The Grove Plantation was purchased in 1942 by future Florida governor LeRoy Collins, and his wife Mary Call Darby Collins, a great-granddaughter of Richard Call. Collins later was elected for two terms as governor. Today the Call-Collins Mansion at the Grove is on the National Register of Historic Places. The Collinses sold the house and property to the state for use as a historic house museum.

Legacy
Several streets in Florida are named after Richard K. Call. Call Streets are in Tallahassee, Starke, Jacksonville, Hollywood, Orange City and High Springs.

The World War II Liberty ship  was named in his honor.

References

Morris, Allen and Joan Perry Morris, compilers. The Florida Handbook 2007–2008 31st Biennial Edition. p. 304.  Peninsula Publishing. Tallahassee. 2007.  Softcover  Hardcover

External links
Biographical Directory of the US Congress
Official Governor's portrait and biography from the State of Florida
Call Family and Brevard Family Papers, Florida Memory, State Library and Archives of Florida. This collection contains correspondence, writings, and other papers of Richard Keith Call and his family from 1788 to 1916. 
 

Governors of Florida Territory
Delegates to the United States House of Representatives from Florida Territory
Members of the Florida Territorial Legislature
19th-century American politicians
1792 births
1862 deaths
United States Army personnel of the War of 1812
American military personnel of the Indian Wars
American people of the Seminole Wars
People of the Creek War
American planters
Florida Whigs
Florida Constitutional Unionists
Southern Unionists in the American Civil War
People from Russellville, Kentucky
People from Tallahassee, Florida
American slave owners
United States Army officers